Ufa State Petroleum Technological University  is a technical university in the city of Ufa.

In October 1941, Gubkin Russian State University of Oil and Gas was evacuated from Moscow to Ufa. 
However, in November 1943 the Gubkin University was returned to Moscow.
On 4 October 1948, the Ufa Petroleum Institute emerged on the basis of Gubkin Russian State University of Oil and Gas.
On 22 November 1993, Ufa Petroleum Institute was renamed to Ufa State Petroleum Technological University.

Faculties 
 Faculty of Automation of Production Processes
 Faculty of Mining and Petroleum
 Faculty of Mechanics
 Institute of Economics (Institute of oil and gas business)
 Faculty of Pipelines
 Faculty of Humanities
 Faculty of Technology
 Faculty of Architecture and Civil Engineering

Branches 
There are 3 branches of the USPTU in the Republic of Bashkortostan: in Oktyabrsky, Salavat and Sterlitamak.

Notable alumni 
Murtaza Rakhimov - the President of the Republic of Bashkortostan, Russia.
Ralif Safin - a Russian oligarch, father of the popular singer Alsou.
Sergei Bogdanchikov - a Russian manager, president of Rosneft.
Alexander Ananenkov - Deputy Chairman of the Board of Gazprom.
Mikhail Bugera - former deputy of the State Duma, deputy of State Assembly of Bashkortostan

Notable professors
Baryi Kalimullin was a Russian architect, educator, and social activist. He is credited with helping to build Ufa Aviation University and Bashkir State University.

References

Universities in Bashkortostan
Education in Ufa
Technical universities and colleges in Russia
Educational institutions established in 1948
1948 establishments in Russia